The American Association of Wine Economists (AAWE) is a non-profit, educational organization based in New York City.

Since 2006, the association has published a peer-reviewed scholarly journal, the Journal of Wine Economics, twice per year, with a focus on "encouraging and communicating economic research and analyses and exchanging ideas in wine economics."  The association partnered with Cambridge University Press to publish the journal in 2012, and plans to publish the journal three times per year beginning in 2013.  The journal's editors include Kym Anderson (University of Adelaide, CEPR and World Bank), Orley Ashenfelter (Princeton University), Victor Ginsburgh (Université Libre de Bruxelles), Robert Stavins (Harvard University) and Karl Storchmann (New York University).

References

External links
 American Association of Wine Economists (official website)
 The Journal of Wine Economics

Economics journals
Economics societies
Educational organizations based in the United States
Non-profit organizations based in New York City
Wine industry organizations